Willer may refer to:

 Willer (surname)
 Willer (given name)
 Willer (footballer) (born 1979), Brazilian footballer
 Willer, Haut-Rhin, a commune in France
 Willer-sur-Thur, a commune in France
 Willer Group, transport company in Japan which owns Willer Express